

La 

Lađanica, Laleta

Le 

Lendava

Li 

Lisičići, Livno

Lo 

Lokva, Lokve, Lokve

Lu 

Lug, Luka, Lukarice, Lukavac, Lukomir, Lukšije

Lists of settlements in the Federation of Bosnia and Herzegovina (A-Ž)